The 1921–22 NHL season was the fifth season of the National Hockey League (NHL). 
Four teams each played 24 games. The league dropped the split season and the two top teams played off for the league championship. The second-place Toronto St. Patricks defeated the first-place Ottawa Senators for the league championship.

For the first four seasons of the NHL, the winner of the league playoffs had faced the winner of the Pacific Coast Hockey Association (PCHA) for the Stanley Cup. That changed this season with the introduction of another professional hockey league called the Western Canada Hockey League (WCHL). Now, three leagues were competing for the coveted Stanley Cup. The winner of a playoff between the PCHA and the WCHL travelled to Toronto to play off for the Stanley Cup. The St. Patricks defeated the Vancouver Millionaires to win the Stanley Cup.

League business
This was the first season away from the split season used in the NHA and the first four NHL seasons. Under the old split system, the winner of each half of the season would face each other in the playoffs. If the same team won both halves, then there would be no league playoffs and that team would simply move on to the Stanley Cup series. For the new system, the top two teams at the end of the season squared off against each other in a two-game total goals series for the chance to move on to the Stanley Cup series.

Frank Calder, NHL president, again declared Sprague Cleghorn property of the Hamilton Tigers and Cleghorn balked at the move. The Tigers asked Cleghorn where he wanted to play other than Ottawa, and he expressed interest in joining his brother on the Montreal Canadiens and so prior to the start of this season, the NHL's first multiple-player trade in its history was made when Billy Coutu and Sprague Cleghorn of the Hamilton Tigers were traded to the Montreal Canadiens for Harry Mummery, Amos Arbour, and Cully Wilson.

Canadiens owner George Kennedy never recovered from the influenza he contracted in 1919, and died on October 19, 1921, at age 39. His widow sold the Canadiens to a unit that would be known affectionately as the Three Musketeers of owners, Leo Dandurand, Louis Letourneau, and Joseph Cattarinich. Dandurand became manager and coach, and immediately there were problems between him and Newsy Lalonde. At one point, Dandurand accused Lalonde of not trying, and also the fans started to boo their old hero. Finally, Lalonde walked out on the team. NHL president Frank Calder mediated the dispute and Lalonde returned to the team. But his days in Montreal were numbered.

Regular season

After a fairly impressive season for the Toronto St. Patricks, the St. Pats goaltender Jake Forbes refused to play after being denied a raise, and was suspended for the season. John Ross Roach took over in goal.

Punch Broadbent was the star this year, as he scored 27 goals in 16 consecutive games en route 
to a 32-goal campaign. Broadbent led the league in goals, assists and points. His Ottawa team finished first, too.

On February 1, Sprague Cleghorn almost wiped out the Ottawa team singlehandedly. He cut Eddie Gerard and Cy Denneny and charged Frank Nighbor. All three players missed two games because of injuries and Cleghorn drew a match penalty and a $30 fine. Ottawa police tried to arrest him in wake of his one-man war.

Final standings

Playoffs

Starting in the Western Canada Hockey League, the Calgary Tigers lost to the Regina Capitals in a match-up to determine second place. The Capitals then went on to beat the first place Edmonton Eskimos in that league's first championship series. Over in the Pacific Coast Hockey Association, once again, the Vancouver Millionaires faced the Seattle Metropolitans for their league championship. The Mets had the better regular season record, but the Millionaires won both games of the playoffs by 1–0 scores. The Millionaires were then matched up against the Capitals to see who would go on to play against the winner of the NHL's playoffs. Vancouver beat Regina in the two-game total goals series.

NHL Championship
The first-place Ottawa Senators played off against the second-place Toronto St. Patricks in a two-game total goals series for the O'Brien Cup. The St. Pats used a strategy of icing the puck to defend their lead.

Toronto St. Patricks vs. Ottawa Senators

Toronto wins total goals series five goals to four.

Stanley Cup Finals

NHL Playoff scoring leader
Note: GP = Games played; G = Goals; A = Assists; Pts = Points

Awards
O'Brien Cup — Toronto St. Patricks

Player statistics

Scoring leaders
Note: GP = Games played; G = Goals; A = Assists; Pts = Points

Leading goaltenders
GP = Games Played, GA = Goals Against, SO = Shutouts, GAA = Goals Against Average
Source: NHL

Coaches
Hamilton Tigers: Joe Malone
Montreal Canadiens: Newsy Lalonde
Ottawa Senators: Pete Green
Toronto St. Patricks: George O'Donoghue

Debuts
The following is a list of players of note who played their first NHL game in 1921–22 (listed with their first team, asterisk(*) marks debut in playoffs):
Billy Boucher, Montreal Canadiens
Frank Boucher, Ottawa Senators
King Clancy, Ottawa Senators
John Ross Roach, Toronto St. Patricks

The last remaining active player to kick off their NHL career this season was Frank Boucher, who played his final NHL game in the 1943–44 season, although he missed the 1922–23, 1923–24, 1924–25, 1925–26, 1938–39, 1939–40, 1940–41, 1941–42, and 1942–43 seasons.

Last games
The following is a list of players of note that played their last game in the NHL in 1921–22 (listed with their last team):

Free agency

Transactions

See also 
 List of Stanley Cup champions
 Pacific Coast Hockey Association
 Western Canada Hockey League
 List of pre-NHL seasons
 1921 in sports
 1922 in sports

References
 
 
 
 
 
 

Notes

 
NHL